The Provident Credit Union Event Center, formerly and more commonly known as the Event Center Arena, is a complex consisting of an indoor arena and a fitness club on the main campus of San José State University in downtown San Jose, California. The Event Center was built in 1989 for the purpose of supporting and providing entertainment as well as recreational opportunities for the student body and university community. The facility is home to the San Jose State Spartans men's and women's basketball teams, which both compete in the Mountain West Conference.

Located in the heart of Silicon Valley, the Event Center at SJSU is the premier mid-size venue in Northern California. The Event Center was designed to accommodate many different events, including musical concerts, sporting events, conferences and corporate parties. The facility has played host to numerous national entertainment acts such as Rage Against the Machine, Eric Clapton, Jerry Garcia Band, Prince, George Lopez, Drake, Wiz Khalifa, Kelly Clarkson, Conan O'Brien, Korn, and Pearl Jam. It also hosts the fall and spring convocation ceremonies for both the College of Engineering and the College of Business at San José State University.

Annually, the Event Center hosts the FIRST Robotics Competition Silicon Valley Regional. The San José State University Career Center also uses the arena to host its fall and spring career fairs, which generally feature hundreds of potential employers for students of the university. 

The Event Center also housed a fully equipped student recreation center, which comprised basketball and racquetball courts and a weight room, before it was replaced in 2019 by a much larger, $130 million facility located next door to the arena.

In August 2019, the university reached an $8.1 million, 20-year deal with Provident Credit Union to rename the Event Center Arena to Provident Credit Union Event Center.

See also
 List of NCAA Division I basketball arenas

References

External links

San Jose State University Event Center Official Site

Indoor arenas in California
College basketball venues in the United States
Gymnastics venues in California
Sports venues in the San Francisco Bay Area
San Jose State Spartans basketball
Sports venues in San Jose, California
1989 establishments in California
Sports venues completed in 1989